All of Who You Are is the debut solo studio album by Simon Collins, son of Phil Collins.

Track listing

Original release
 "All of Who You Are" – 4:58
 "Pride" – 5:36
 "Money Maker" – 5:16
 "Anymore" – 4:31
 "Coast" – 5:49
 "Ocean Deep Inside" – 5:36
 "Sphere" – 5:45
 "In My Life" – 5:45
 "Jaded" – 4:44
 "These Dreams" – 4:45
 "Light Years Away" – 6:27

Re-release
 "All of Who You Are" – 4:58
 "Pride" – 5:36
 "Money Maker" – 5:16
 "Anymore" – 4:31
 "Coast" – 5:49
 "Ocean Deep Inside" – 5:36
 "Shine Through" – 3:35
 "Sphere" – 5:45
 "In My Life" – 5:45
 "Jaded" – 4:44
 "These Dreams" – 4:45
 "Light Years Away" – 6:27

References

External links
 Simon Collins official website

1999 debut albums
Simon Collins albums